Uganda Clearing Industry & Forwarding Association (UCIFA website) is a member-owned institution with over 200 companies licensed by URA (Uganda Revenue Authority). Its secretariat is located in Nakawa, Kampala on Jinja Road, opposite Spear Motors.

With the slogan "Bridging the Gap of Tax Collection", UCIFA's activities are based on the foundations of professionalism and well established working synergies with stakeholders at both national and international levels. It also used to be referred to as Uganda Clearing and Forwarding Agents Association (UCFAA) and the Uganda Clearing Industry and Forwarders Association.

Functions

As the foremost umbrella body of clearing and forwarding firms in Uganda, UCIFA is an intermediary between customs and importers plus exporters. They carry out the necessary customs documentation and lodgments of entries. The body advises clients on customs requirements, laws, regulations and procedures. UCIFA updates clients on changes that occur from time to time. It facilitates import and export operations in the most efficient and cost effective manner. Also, it advises on the mode of transport and the facilities in transportation; liaises with Uganda Revenue Authority and other stakeholders in the facilitation of import and export business thus facilitating trade and tax collection.

UCIFA used to be the Most Vibrant Association in the history of the East African Region. When Gideon Karioko, the former Chairman died, the association went into a limbo until Omar Kassim was elected into office. He had 213 members to work with. By 2006, two years down the line, the association was almost back to its former glory.

Competition

UFFA (Uganda Freight Forwarders Association) was formed by a disgruntled Chairperson elected out of office with a predominant membership of shipping lines and multinational companies plus a few indigenous ones but today, UCIFA is known to have the biggest number of both indigenous and foreign-owned companies.

Another splinter association was also formed out of UCIFA in 2009 and named FUCAFF.

References

Trade associations based in Uganda
Freight forwarders associations